Brush Electrical Machines is a manufacturer of electrical generators typically for gas turbine and steam turbine driven applications. The main office is based at Loughborough in Leicestershire, UK.

History
Charles Francis Brush, born in Cleveland, Ohio in 1849, founded the Brush Electric Light Company, which stayed in business in the U.S. until 1889 when it was absorbed into the Thomson-Houston Company making Brush a wealthy man.

In 1880, the Anglo-American Brush Electric Light Corporation was established in Lambeth, London. Its formation was to exploit the invention of Brush's first electric dynamo in 1876.

As the business grew, due to the demand for new electrical apparatus, larger premises were sought, and in 1889 the corporation moved 100 miles north into the newly acquired Falcon Engine and Car Works at Loughborough under the new name, Brush Electrical Engineering Company Limited.

In 1914, the company began manufacturing Ljungstrom steam turbines under licence.

Over the next sixty years, the business grew by acquisitions, until in 1957, the Brush companies were incorporated into the Hawker Siddeley Group. Within the group, the company manufactured a vast range of electrical products, including turbo generators, salient pole machines, induction motors, traction motors and generators, traction locomotives, switchgear, transformers and fuses.

In November 1991 Hawker Siddeley Electric Power Group was subject to a hostile takeover bid of £1.5 billion from BTR plc, the large engineering conglomerate. The bid was successful so the Brush companies then became part of the BTR organisation.

In November 1996 the FKI Group of Companies acquired the Hawker Siddeley Electric Power Group from BTR for a price of £182 million.

On 1 July 2008, Melrose plc completed the acquisition with FKI, Melrose being a specialist investor in the manufacturing industry, is now registered on the London Stock Exchange.

During the last 125 years, various Brush companies (Brush Switchgear, Brush Transformers, Brush Traction and Brush Control Gear) have existed on the Falcon Works site, but throughout this period Brush Electrical Machines Ltd manufacturing generators and motors has always been the largest company. Over 5,000 staff were employed on the site during the 1960s and 70s.

The following products are manufactured by Brush:
 Air-cooled turbo generators in the range of 20 to 300MVA
 Turbomotors from 10 to 100MW
 Associated control equipment

In 2018, all production moved to the Czech Republic causing the closure of the Loughborough plant.

Aircraft manufacture
In 1915, Brush Electrical was one of a number of companies outside the established aviation contractors selected by the Royal Navy to receive orders for aircraft to meet the expanding needs of the Royal Naval Air Service. Brush completed 650 aircraft by the end of 1919, including 400 Avro 504s and 142 Short Type 184s. It also built de Havilland Dragon Rapides during the Second World War, taking over production from de Havilland in 1943 and building 346 aircraft (47.5% of the total number produced) by the time production ended in 1945.

See also
Brush Traction
Brush Transformers
Associated British Oil Engine Company

References

Jackson, A. J. De Havilland Aircraft since 1909. London: Putnam, Third edition, 1987. .
Robertson, Bruce. "Brush-built Aircraft, 1915-1919". Air Pictorial, November 1970, Vol. 32 No. 11. pp. 396–398.

External links
Brush Electrical Machines website

 Collection of historical documents/photographs on the origins of Brush companies in the U.S. and UK

Companies based in Loughborough
Engineering companies of the United Kingdom
Electrical engineering companies of the United Kingdom
Manufacturing companies of the United Kingdom
Hawker Siddeley